Lindsay Gardner may refer to:

Lindsay Gardner (born 1960), American media executive
Lindsay C. Gardner (born 1875), Canadian politician